Ilya Musin may refer to:

Ilya Musin (conductor) (1903–1999), Russian conductor 
Ilya Musin (ice hockey) (born 1991), Russian ice hockey player